Agonidium bamboutense is a species of ground beetle in the subfamily Platyninae. It was described by Burgeon in 1942.

References

bamboutense
Beetles described in 1942